Banská Štiavnica is a town in central Slovakia, in the middle of an immense caldera created by the collapse of an ancient volcano. For its size, the caldera is known as the Štiavnica Mountains. Banská Štiavnica has a population of more than 10,000. It is a completely preserved medieval town. Because of their historical value, the town and its surroundings were proclaimed by the UNESCO to be a World Heritage Site on December 11, 1993.

History
The fate of Banská Štiavnica has been closely linked to the exploitation of its abundant resources of silver ore. According to evidence from excavations, the site was settled during the Neolithic period.

The first mining settlement was founded by Celts in the 3rd century BC. It was probably occupied by the Celtic Cotini tribe. Roman authors mentioned mining activities of the Cotini, who had lived in present-day central Slovakia until they were deported to Pannonia within the Marcomannic Wars by Rome. The site was also settled by early Slavs and an old Slovak fortified settlement was situated here in the 10th and 11th century. The site was called “terra banensium” (the land of miners) as early as 1156. The local population gave the name „Štiavnica“ (acidic stream) to the settlement in the valley, and the settlement on the hill above (Ligotavá hora, or Glanzenberg – the shiny mountain) came to be called „Bana“ (the mine). The single common name „Schebnyzbana“ was documented for the first time in 1255. The local Slavic population was joined by skilled German settlers who started arriving in the 13th century. They adapted the local name to the German "Schemnitz". Banská Štiavnica gained the status of a royal town in 1238, as one of the first towns in the Kingdom of Hungary.

In the High and Late Middle Ages, the town was the main producer of silver and gold in the Kingdom of Hungary. During the Ottoman Wars, the Turks made concerted efforts to conquer rich mining towns in Upper Hungary (Banská Štiavnica, Banská Bystrica, and Kremnica). This new threat led Banská Štiavnica to build powerful fortifications, including two castles, in the 16th century. As one of the most important centers of the Protestant Reformation in the country, the town belonged to the Protestant "League of Seven Mining Towns" together with Banská Belá, Banská Bystrica, Kremnica, Ľubietová, Nová Baňa, and Pukanec.

The town was also a leading center of innovation in the mining industry. In 1627, gunpowder was used there in a mine for one of the first times in the world (After Le Thillot, France). To drain water from the flooded mines, a sophisticated system of water reservoirs and channels, known as tajchy, was designed and built by the local scientists Jozef Karol Hell, Maximilian Hell, and Samuel Mikovíny in the 18th century. Tajchy not only saved the mines from being closed, but also provided energy for the early phase of industrialization.

Its Mining Academy, founded there in 1735 by Samuel Mikovíny, was the first mining school in the Kingdom of Hungary. Beginning in 1763, the Hofkammer in Vienna, with support from Queen Maria Theresa, transformed the school into the Academy of Mining. In 1807, a Forestry Institute was "established under the decision of Emperor Franz I"; in 1848 the school was renamed the Academy of Mining and Forestry, 'the first technical university in the world'. In 1919, after the creation of Czechoslovakia, the Academy was moved to Sopron in Hungary. The student traditions of the Academy (School traditions of Selmec) are still living in its successors, the University of Miskolc and Slovak University of Technology in Bratislava, and colleges in Sopron, Székesfehérvár, and Dunaújváros.

In 1782, Banská Štiavnica was the third biggest town in the Kingdom of Hungary (with 23,192 or incl. suburbs 40,000 inhabitants), after Pozsony (today Bratislava) and Debrecen. But the town's development was too closely linked to the mining activity which had been progressively declining since the second half of the 19th century. Nowadays, Banská Štiavnica is an important center of recreation and tourism, benefiting from its rich historical heritage.

During World War II, Banská Štiavnica was taken by Soviet troops of the 53rd Army on 7 March 1945.

Landmarks

The heart of the town is the historical Trinity Square dominated by a monumental plague column. The square is used for frequent cultural events and there is also a mineralogical museum. 
Two castles, the so-called “old” one (Slovak: Starý zámok) and “new” one (Slovak: Nový zámok), have been transformed into museums.

Visitors will receive helmets, cloaks and lamps to use during the tour. It is also possible to have an English, German or Hungarian speaking guide if this is requested in advance. Another ancient mine open to the public (Slovak: Glanzenberg) is even older. This mine, situated just under the center of the town, has attracted numerous famous visitors, from Emperor Joseph II to Prince Albert of Monaco.

The town is surrounded by ancient artificial mining water reservoirs called tajchy. Sixty reservoirs were built in the 15th through 18th centuries in order to provide energy for the booming mining industry. These extraordinary historical monuments are now used mainly for recreation.

Churches
 St. Catherine's Church
In Kalvária Banská Štiavnica there is a complex of churches and chapels near Ostry vrch which was built in the eighteenth century by the Jesuits.

Demographics
Banská Štiavnica has a population of 10,674 (as of December 31, 2005). According to the 2001 census, 93.9% of inhabitants were Slovaks and 2% Romani people. Many people are descendants of the Carpathian Germans, who played a very important role in the medieval history of the town. The religious makeup was 65% Roman Catholics, 18.9% people with no religious affiliation, and 7.6% Lutherans.

Twin towns – sister cities

Banská Štiavnica is twinned with:
 Hünenberg, Switzerland
 Moravská Třebová, Czech Republic
 Olsztynek, Poland
 Ptuj, Slovenia
 Sopron, Hungary
 Tatabánya, Hungary

Notable people
Ulrika Babiaková, astronomer
Jozef Karol Hell, Hungarian inventor and mining engineer
Maximilian Hell, Hungarian astronomer
Dezo Hoffmann, photographer
Anton Hykisch, writer, diplomat and politician
Nikolaus Joseph von Jacquin, Austrian scientist
Andrej Kmeť, scientist
Domokos Kosáry, Hungarian historian
Ľudovít Lačný, chess problem composer
Master MS, Hungarian painter
Samuel Mikovíny, mathematician, engineer and cartographer
Alexander Pituk, Hungarian chess problem composer
Emília Vášáryová, actress
Magdaléna Vášáryová, actress and diplomat
Andrej Sládkovič, Evangelical Lutheran priest, poet, critic, publicist and translator

Genealogical resources
The records for genealogical research are available at the state archive, "Statny Archiv in Banska Bystrica, Slovakia"

 Roman Catholic church records (births/marriages/deaths): 1627–1892 (parish A)
 Lutheran church records (births/marriages/deaths): 1594–1925 (parish A)

Gallery

See also
 List of municipalities and towns in Slovakia
 School traditions of Selmec
 Senica, Slovakia (German: Senitz)

References

External links

Official website
Map of Banská Štiavnica
Tourist information about Banská Štiavnica
History of Banská Štiavnica
Banská Štiavnica Photo Gallery
The Calvary Mount of Banská Štiavnica
Surnames of living people in Banská Štiavnica

 
Cities and towns in Slovakia
World Heritage Sites in Slovakia
Banská Štiavnica District